Bloody Baron may refer to:

"The Bloody Baron", a quest in The Witcher 3: Wild Hunt video game
a ghost and member of the Hogwarts staff in the Harry Potter series
Roman von Ungern-Sternberg (1886–1921), authoritarian ruler of Mongolia, nicknamed the Bloody Baron